Guy Sterling (born September 23, 1948) is an American journalist, author and historian. He spent most of his 35-year newspaper career as a reporter with The Star-Ledger in Newark, New Jersey, primarily covering the courts and criminal justice matters, the Meadowlands sports complex and the New Jersey Mafia.

Background and early life
Sterling was born in Orange Memorial Hospital in Orange, New Jersey. He earned his undergraduate degree from the University of Virginia in Charlottesville (class of 1970) and a master's degree in journalism from the Columbia University Graduate School of Journalism (class of 1972). He began his daily newspaper career in 1970 as a municipal government reporter with the Courier-News in Plainfield, New Jersey and ended it in Newark. Over the course of his career, Sterling routinely published as many as 200 bylined stories a year.

Author and independent researcher
Sterling has authored two books: Elvis in Roanoke, published in 1977 when he was a reporter with The Roanoke Times & World-News (1975–78) in Roanoke, VA, and The Famous, the Familiar and the Forgotten: 350 Notable Newarkers in 2014. In 2011 and 2012, he also wrote and produced a series of radio pieces on Newark's history for WBGO Jazz Radio 88.3 in Newark. They aired as a segment entitled "Guy Sterling's Newark" on the "WBGO Journal."

External links

Career at The Star-Ledger
Sterling spent almost 30 years as a general assignment reporter in Newark, starting in 1980 and retiring in 2009. He won a national award for excellence in music writing and was a member of The Star-Ledger staff that won a Pulitzer Prize for breaking news reporting. Also, a story of his was used as the theme for an award-winning season of the HBO series The Sopranos and, when he left daily journalism, he was given a retirement party by the mob and a plaque for his organized crime coverage by the U.S. Justice Department. Sterling was a lead reporter in The Star-Ledger’s coverage of the fatal dormitory fire at Seton Hall University in 2000, stories that continued for years. They earned the paper its first-ever selection as a Pulitzer Prize finalist along with the American Society of Newspaper Editors Jesse Laventhol Prize for Deadline News Reporting by a Team in 2001.

Other major stories he covered were as follows:

 1980 – Covered all legal proceedings against an Irvington man charged and later convicted of killing a Port Authority police officer on a PATH train.
 1980 – Covered the weeks-long PATH strike.
 1980 – Covered a rail accident between an Amtrak commuter car and a Conrail work train in Linden that killed one and injured 20.
 1980 – Broke the story that 1960's anti-war activist and counterculture ringleader Jerry Rubin had gone mainstream and joined a Wall Street brokerage firm.
 1980 – Covered the reinstatement of the Selective Service draft.
 1980 – Wrote a retrospective on Hoffmann and Swinburne islands, man-made islands in Lower New York Bay opened as human quarantine facilities during the vast nineteenth-century European migration to the U.S.
 1980 – Wrote a four-part series on school bus safety in New Jersey.
 1980 – Led the coverage of New Jersey's effort to pass a law banning ticket scalping for several years until its enactment by Gov. Thomas Kean.
 1981 – Covered the creation of High Occupancy Vehicle (HOV) lanes on the Garden State Parkway and a legal challenge by motorists that eventually did away with them.
 1981 – Covered the last New Jersey Nets basketball game at the Rutgers Athletic Center in Piscataway, the NBA team's home for four years while awaiting completion of the Meadowlands Arena in East Rutherford.
 1981 – Wrote a series of stories on the growing problem of missing persons in New Jersey that led to legislation creating a missing persons bureau inside the New Jersey State Police.
 1981 – Wrote among the first articles in the mainstream press on the federal government's interest in marijuana's potential as medicine and the subsequent approval of synthetic THC as an antiemetic.
 1981 – Drew the assignment to cover the opening of the Meadowlands Arena in East Rutherford, NJ, on July 2, featuring a Bruce Springsteen concert. In later years, Sterling covered the New York Giants' first two Super Bowl appearances, two NCAA men's basketball Final Fours (one of them at the Meadowlands) and the 1994 men's World Cup in the U.S.
 1981 – Wrote a feature story on New Jersey's hand-carved wooden carousels.
 1981 – Covered from its inception on October 21 right through the court proceedings years later the botched $1.6 million Brink's armored car robbery in Rockland County, NY, in which two police officers and an armed guard were killed by members of the Weather Underground and Black Liberation Army. Sterling was one of only a handful of reporters allowed in the heavily secured Nyack, NY, courtroom when the first three defendants arrested in the case were brought in for their initial court hearings.
 1981 – Wrote a series of investigative pieces about corruption and mismanagement inside the New Jersey Commission for the Blind and Visually Impaired, a state agency based in Newark, that led to a probe by the Attorney General's Office.
 1982 – Wrote a feature story on New Jersey's legendary pool players, including Willie Mosconi.
 1982 – An investigative piece he wrote on the growing problem of missing persons in New Jersey led the state Legislature to create a Division of Missing Persons within the New Jersey State Police.
 1982 – Covered oral arguments in U.S. Sen. Harrison A. Williams' appeal of his Abscam conviction along with his first day behind bars.
 1982 – From the day of the incident until sentencing four years later, Sterling was the lead reporter in the case of the first New Jersey state trooper to be found guilty of committing a crime in connection with a duty-related death.
 1982 – Sterling was the only New Jersey-based reporter to interview Richard Nixon after the former president moved to the New York area to rehabilitate his image in the final years of his life. They spoke on two occasions.
 1983 – Covered a Hells Angels press conference in New York discrediting the congressional testimony of one of its members that the motorcycle gang had put a contract out on the life of Rolling Stones lead singer Mick Jagger after the infamous Altamount concert in California.
 1983 – Wrote a profile of J. Walter Duncan Jr., owner of the New Jersey Generals in the United States Football League.
 1983 – Wrote a four-part series on the re-emergence of professional prizefighting in New Jersey spurred by the growth of Atlantic City casinos as boxing venues.
 1983 – Wrote a feature story on New Jersey's foremost climate historian, David M. Ludlum.
 1983 – Covered the “CBS Murders” trial in New York in which a Keansburg handyman was convicted of killing four people, one a woman who was a federal witness in a million-dollar diamond district fraud case and three CBS employees who came to her aid as she was fatally shot in a midtown Manhattan parking garage.
 1983 – Wrote about the gangland slaying of Peter A. "Peter Rabbit" Campisi, a member of a Newark-based organized crime group whose body was found in the trunk of a car in New York, as well as the choking death of Peter S. "Petey Black" Campisi in June 2002.
 1983 – Covered two New York City Marathons, including the one in 1983 won by Rod Dixon of New Zealand.
 1984 – Covered the merger of the New Jersey Highway Patrol and State Police.
 1984 – Broke all the stories about an undercover state investigation ("Operation Bacchus") of the liquor industry that resulted in numerous charges.
 1984 – Broke all the stories on a suspicious harness race at the Meadowlands Racetrack that triggered a riot by horseplayers and a second one at Garden State Park several years later that prompted a state investigation dubbed "Operation Longshot."
 1984 – Covered President Ronald Reagan's campaign speech in a church gym during Hoboken's St. Ann's festival on July 26.
 1984 – Covered the "Victory" tour stop at Giants Stadium that featured pop superstar Michael Jackson and his family.
 1984 – Covered Bruce Springsteen's record-breaking run of 10 consecutive concerts at the Meadowlands Arena in August.
 1984 – Covered a New Brunswick campaign rally for Democratic presidential candidate and former vice president Walter Mondale.
 1985 – Covered a Rutgers Board of Governors meeting disrupted by students demanding the university divest itself of stock with investments in racially segregated South Africa and its aftermath.
 1985 – Wrote an advance and covered the opening of the rebuilt Garden State Park Racetrack in Cherry Hill, NJ.
 1985 – Covered the sale of Monmouth Park racetrack to the New Jersey Sports and Exposition Authority.
 1985 – Covered the capture in Virginia of self-proclaimed revolutionary Thomas Manning, a fugitive who was wanted in connection with the 1981 murder of a decorated New Jersey state trooper during a highway shootout in Warren County.
 1985 – Covered the demolition of Jersey City's Roosevelt Stadium, the minor league ballpark built by Frank Hague where Jackie Robinson broke professional baseball's color line in 1947.
 1985 – Was the only reporter to cover Frank Sinatra's concert at the Meadowlands Arena in December, marking the singer's 75th birthday. Sterling also reported on Sinatra receiving an honorary doctorate from Stevens Institute of Technology in his hometown of Hoboken, NJ.
 1985 – Broke the story that police had uncovered a car theft ring operating out of East Orange, NJ, that employed children to steal vehicles throughout North Jersey.
 1985 – Wrote an advance on Bruce Springsteen's record-breaking six Giants Stadium concerts that included interviews with Les Paul, Fats Domino, Little Richard, Carl Perkins, Connie Francis, Frankie Valli, Chubby Checker, Otis Blackwell and author Greil Marcus.
 1985 – Covered the “Pizza Connection” trial in New York City, the longest criminal trial in U.S. federal court history (lasting into 1987) in which 20 defendants, including six men from New Jersey as well as the former boss of the Sicilian mob, were accused of laundering Mafia drug money through a network of American pizza shops.
 1985 – Surveyed the feelings of New Jersey law enforcement officials about the daring gangland execution of Gambino crime family boss Paul Castellano in the street outside a midtown Manhattan restaurant and its impact on organized crime.
 1986 – Honored by the New Jersey Fire Prevention and Protection Association for a four-part series on the state of firefighting in New Jersey.
 1986 – Covered the Meadowlands sports complex events for “Liberty Weekend,” the Statue of Liberty's centenary celebration held from July 3 through 6.
 1987 – Interviewed New York Giants owner Wellington Mara in advance of the team's first Super Bowl win.
 1987 – Was sent to the Rose Bowl in Pasadena, CA, to cover off-the-field activities and events associated with Super Bowl XXI as part of the Giants’ first appearance in the game.
 1987 – Profiled New York Giants general manager George Young.
 1987 – Worked with state Sen. Richard J. Codey in uncovering faulty hiring practices at a state psychiatric hospital in Monmouth County.
 1987 – Covered the selection and induction of Negro leagues third baseman and longtime Newark resident Ray Dandridge into the National Baseball Hall of Fame in Cooperstown, NY.
 1987 – Wrote dozens of stories over the years on New Jersey's efforts to streamline and upgrade the state's motor vehicle services, mostly auto inspections and driver licensing.
 1987 – Covered the end of the NFL players' strike.
 1987 – Wrote many stories about Black Liberation Army fugitive Joanne Chesimard, including the publication of her autobiography and the effort by state authorities to seize the royalties.
 1988 – Broke the stories that reputed Genovese crime family boss and former pro prizefighter John DiGilio had gone missing. and was later found murdered.
 1988 – Spent a day with candidate Jesse Jackson on his tour of New Jersey during the Democratic presidential primary campaign.
 1988 – Covered the federal court hearing in which it was decided that the heavyweight championship fight in Atlantic City between Mike Tyson and Michael Spinks, both undefeated, would be 12 rounds, not 15.
 1988 – Covered the Newark Athletic Hall of Fame's initial induction ceremony.
 1988 – Covered the decision keeping "The Hambletonian" in New Jersey after Illinois officials made a last-minute attempt to lure harness racing's most renowned event back to their state fair where it had previously been contested for many years.
 1988 – Interviewed black-listed singer-songwriter Earl Robinson, famous for composing songs performed by Paul Robeson.
 1989 – Wrote the obit of a combat-wounded World War II veteran from Newark whose fight to keep his military benefits and job with the VA when it was discovered he was a member of the Socialist Workers Party was turned into a book and movie.
 1989 – Covered the court hearing in which former federal prosecutor Judy Russell was ruled innocent by reason of insanity after she was charged with sending a series of threatening letters to herself and a federal magistrate during the trial of two alleged Sikh terrorists that she was handling.
 1989 – Covered the federal extortion trial of Newark councilman George Branch, a case that ended with the judge dismissing all charges at the end of the prosecution's case.
 1989 – Covered the run of Seton Hall's men's basketball team to the NCAA Division I championship game during Final Four weekend in Seattle.
 1989 – Sat in on ex-Gov. Brendan Byrne's politics class at the Eagleton Institute in New Brunswick for a story.
 1989 – Covered the death and funeral of Newark-based jazz trumpeter and composer Woody Shaw.
 1989 – Wrote every story about the planning, design, funding and construction of New Jersey's Vietnam veterans memorial at the Garden State Arts Center in Holmdel up until its dedication.
 1989 – Flew to Richmond, VA, to lead the paper's coverage of the arrest of John List, an inconspicuous businessman who murdered his wife, mother and three children before fleeing their home in Westfield, NJ, and becoming one of America's most wanted fugitives for almost 18 years.
 1989 – Was the only reporter to write about a decision by the New York Giants to deny the Rolling Stones use of Giants Stadium for a series of concerts for fear of disrupting their practice schedule.
 1989 – Covered the trial in Newark of African-American street legend Wayne “Akbar” Pray, who was convicted under the federal drug kingpin statute and sentenced to life in prison without parole.
 1989 – Covered a breach of contract suit filed in federal court by New Jersey promoter John Scher against tennis great Ivan Lendl.
 1989 – Covered the mysterious death of Grateful Dead fan Adam Katz at a Meadowlands Arena concert and a subsequent grand jury investigation.
 1989 – Provided the only local advance news coverage of the NCAA Division I men's soccer championship at Rutgers Stadium in Piscataway.
 1989-92 – Covered the federal racketeering trial in Newark of Genovese crime family boss Louis "Bobby" Manna, who was accused of plotting the murder of rival mob kingpin John Gotti among other charges.
 1990 – Covered jazz singer Sarah Vaughan's funeral at the Mount Zion Baptist Church in Newark in April.
 1990 – Covered the government's effort to revoke the citizenship of a reputed Nazi concentration camp guard known as the “Black Commander” who'd been living in New Jersey.
 1990 – Was the only reporter to cover Frank Sinatra's concert at the Meadowlands Arena celebrating his 75th birthday, a concert that was taped for airing on national TV.
 1991 – Wrote all the stories leading up to and including the start of Sunday horseracing in New Jersey.
 1991 – Was sent to Tampa, FL, to cover off-the-field activities and events associated with Super Bowl XXV as part of the Giants’ second appearance in the game.
 1991 – Interviewed businessman and former U.S. postmaster Bob Tisch after his purchase of 50 percent of the football Giants.
 1991 – Covered the resignation of Bill Parcells as head coach of the football Giants.
 1991 – Wrote a story on the tenth anniversary of the Meadowlands Arena in East Rutherford.
 1991 – Wrote a retrospective on Passaic's Capitol Theatre after its demolition with a heavy emphasis on its years as a rock venue.
 1991 – Covered a grand jury presentment that sharply criticized security at the Meadowlands Sports Complex as heavy-handed and lax in personnel supervision.
 1991 – Wrote a story on the 200th anniversary of the ratification of the Bill of Rights.
 1992 – Covered the selection of New Jersey as a site for 1994 World Cup games.
 1992 – Covered the announcement that the annual Army-Navy college football game would be returning to New Jersey and Giants Stadium.
 1992 – Wrote a two-part series on Bruce Springsteen's return to the stage in New Jersey after exiling himself to California for several years.
 1992 – Covered the New Jersey Sports Authority's approval of the architectural plans for the proposed $23.5 million expansion of Rutgers Stadium in Piscataway.
 1992-93 – Covered the longest criminal trial in New Jersey state court history, a year-long racketeering case in Newark against Robert "Cabert" Bisaccia and other reputed members of the Gambino crime family's New Jersey crew that ended in the convictions of all but one of the defendants.
 1993 – Covered Harvard Law School appearances by former prizefighter Rubin (Hurricane) Carter and the federal judge from Newark who freed him after Carter had spent years in state prison for the killing of three men in Paterson, NJ.
 1993 – Wrote a 25-year retrospective of the Jimi Hendrix's Experience's only New Jersey appearance, a concert held at Newark's Symphony Hall on April 4, 1968.
 1993 – Wrote an article for Editor & Publisher on a U.S. Supreme Court case that addressed how much information law enforcement could keep from the public in the course of a criminal investigation.
 1993 – Wrote a story about more than a dozen New Jersey mobsters entering the federal witness protection program
 1993 – Wrote a story about a mixup over two soldiers from New Jersey with the same unusual name who served in combat during the Vietnam War, one of whom died in action and the other who lived.
 1993 – Was the only reporter inside Newark's Symphony Hall to cover Howard Stern's 1993 controversial pay-per-view New Year's Eve special.
 1992-94 – Led the New Jersey coverage of the 1994 World Cup from the moment the state decided to bid for the event right through the seven games (including a semi-final) that were held at the Meadowlands sport complex and the championship game at the Rose Bowl in Pasadena, CA.
 1994 – Conducted a jailhouse interview with reputed New Jersey mob capo Anthony (Tumac) Accetturo after he turned state government informant.
 1994 – Took the on-site photo in Bethel, NY, as two Star-Ledger music critics reminisced about their experiences at the 1969 Woodstock festival.
 1994 – Wrote the story that prosecutors would seek the death penalty in the New Jersey murder case that produced Megan's Law.
 1994 – Broke the story that women had been cleared to box professionally in New Jersey.
 1995 – Covered the entire federal corruption trial of Newark councilmen Gary Harris and Ralph Grant Jr. that ended in convictions and prison sentences.
 1995 – Covered the visit of Pope John Paul II to New Jersey, including the mass he celebrated for 83,000 worshippers at Giants Stadium.
 1995 – Revisited the gangland slaying in Newark of notorious mobster Dutch Schultz on its 60th anniversary.
 1995 – Broke the story that the Brendan Byrne Arena at the Meadowlands sports complex was changing its name to the Continental Airlines Arena as part of a sponsorship deal.
 1996 – Wrote all the stories about the Meadowlands sports complex getting chosen to host and hosting the 1996 NCAA's men's Final Four basketball championships.
 1996 – Found former Seton Hall basketball star and Utah Jazz first-round draft pick Luther Wright a patient in an Essex County, NJ, psychiatric hospital. A subsequent story on Wright's life and the circumstances that left him institutionalized – co-authored by Sterling and entitled “Whose Dream Was It?” – won the New Jersey Press Association award for best news feature story of the year.
 1996 – Wrote numerous stories exposing the life and swindles of con man Roger “Doc” Fields, including his obituary.
 1996 – Uncovered serious problems inside the Newark Jazz Festival that ultimately led to its undoing.
 1996 – Drove to Hanover Shoe Farms in Hanover, PA, to research the career of Albatross, one of harness racing's all-time great competitors and sires.
 1997 – Wrote an obituary of notorious mob boss Simone “Sam the Plumber” DeCavalcante.
 1997 – Wrote a retrospective of Elvis Presley on the twentieth anniversary of his death.
 1997 – Broke the story that Giants Stadium had been selected to host the opening ceremonies of the 1999 women's World Cup as well as some games.
 1997-98 – Covered a state-appointed commission, which included the participation of Donald Trump as a member, that looked at the future of horseracing in New Jersey and recommended the installation of slot machines at the tracks.
 1998 – On its 50th anniversary, wrote a retrospective on the third and final Rocky Graziano-Tony Zale middleweight championship fight held at Newark's Ruppert Stadium.
 1998 – Covered the sale of the NBA's New Jersey Nets to a consortium of New Jersey businessmen intent on moving the team from the Meadowlands to Newark.
 1998 – Was left the only press copy of a videotaped suicide note made by George Weingartner, a former Bayonne policeman and reputed crew boss of the Genovese crime family who was facing trial on state racketeering charges
 1998 – Spent 17 years working to free New Jersey inmate Vincent James Landano, who was wrongfully convicted of killing an off-duty Newark policeman during the robbery of a Kearny, NJ, check-cashing business in August 1976. After years of legal wrangling that included a groundbreaking U.S. Supreme Court decision, the conviction was eventually overturned and Landano was acquitted of all charges at a 1998 retrial in Jersey City.
 1998 – Wrote about the demise of the Newark Jazz Festival after a seven-year run.
 1998 – Wrote about a state referendum asking New Jersey voters whether they approved of off-track betting sites and phone wagering.
 1999 – Wrote about a mob informant's complaints over his treatment as a protected witness.
 1999 – Covered heavyweight champion George Foreman's appearance before a federal grand jury in Newark investigating corruption inside boxing's sanctioning organizations, a case that later went to trial and ended in a conviction.
 1999 – Played a leading role in the paper's in-depth investigation of the fatal shooting of an on-duty Orange police officer and the many missteps of investigators in identifying and arresting the killer.
 1999 – Traveled to Atlantic City to write about the transformation of Atlantic City's iconic Convention Hall on the boardwalk into a 15,000-seat sports and entertainment venue.
 1999 – Wrote a story on the restoration of Atlantic City Convention Hall's historic pipe organ, the world's largest.
 2000 – Was featured in an Editor & Publisher article and editorial focusing on The Star-Ledger's decision to withhold the names of suspects in the fatal Seton Hall dormitory fire while the investigation proceeded.
 2000 – Broke the story, after getting hold of an unpublished legal ruling, that the state appeals court in New Jersey had ordered the immediate release of convicted cop-killer Tommy Trantino, then the longest serving inmate in state prison at 38 years.
 2000 – Covered the federal corruption trial of International Boxing Federation president Bob Lee that ended in a split verdict.
 2000 – Profiled Herve Filion, harness racing's all-time leading driver.
 2001 – Profiled Roger Lowenstein, the lawyer who helped free Tommy Trantino from prison who became a TV scriptwriter and educator.
 2001 – Wrote an obituary for the blues legend John Lee Hooker.
 2001 – Co-authored a lengthy and detailed account of the cold-blooded highway murder of an over-the-road truck driver by a Newark homicide fugitive and an underage accomplice.
 2001 – Unwound the strange and treacherous relationship between Philly Faye and Pete The Crumb, two aging mobsters who spent years plotting against each other.
 2001 – Wrote more than a half-dozens obituaries in the paper's “Lives Remembered” project, an effort to remember as many victims of September 11 attacks as possible.
 2002 – Covered the attempt by Australian and New Zealand horse racing legend Lyell Creek to bring his winning ways to the Meadowlands Racetrack competing against the world's best trotters.
 2002 – Wrote a retrospective on the renegade Campisi crime family from Newark prompted by the accidental choking death of “Petey Black” Campisi.
 2002 – Honored by the Epilepsy Foundation of New Jersey at its annual dinner.
 2002 – Covered a blistering attack a federal judge made on Newark from the bench for spending millions on a new sports arena rather investing to cure the city's social ills.
 2003 – Revisited the tragic life and death of celebrated Newark keyboardist Larry Young Jr.
 2003 – Wrote a retrospective on the history of jazz in Newark for a special section on jazz.
 2003 – Dug out the life of Eddie Paul Harris, a blues singer and guitarist known as “Carolina Slim” who pursued a career in music after leaving North Carolina and settling in Newark.
 2003 – Was the lead reporter on a series of stories about three brothers who were locked in the basement of a Newark apartment house, one of whom (Faheem Williams) died and had his remains stuffed in a plastic bin while the other two were starved and left to perish. That coverage won the National Association of Black Journalists and New Jersey Press Association awards for best breaking news coverage of the year and resulted in changes in child welfare laws throughout the country.
 2004 – Covered the federal murder trial of Philadelphia crime boss Joseph “Skinny Joey” Merlino in Newark that ended in acquittal.
 2004 – Covered the NJPAC first-day-of-issue ceremony for the "American Choreographers” postal stamps.
 2004 – Wrote a 35-year retrospective on the Atlantic City Pop Festival, which was held at the Atlantic City Race Course two weeks before Woodstock and featured many of the same artists.
 2004 – Recalled the tragic life and career of unheralded but amazingly talented stride pianist Donald “The Lamb” Lambert.
 2004 – Wrote an obituary for John F.X. Irving, dean of the Seton Hall University Law School from 1971 to 1977.
 2005 – Was a member of the staff that won the Pulitzer Prize for breaking news for coverage of Jim McGreevey's resignation as New Jersey governor with a confession he was a "gay American."
 2005 – Recounted Bob Dylan's weekend trips to East Orange, NJ, to visit his musical hero, folksinger Woody Guthrie.
 2005 – Wrote a story on the Rolling Stones’ first concert in New Jersey – at Newark's Symphony Hall – on the show's 40th anniversary.
 2005 – Wrote the obituary for New Jersey country music legend Smokey Warren.
 2005 – Wrote the obituary for Charles Cummings, a Newark librarian and the city's official historian.
 2006 – Wrote an advance on the movie “Find Me Guilty” that was based on an infamous organized crime trial in Newark.
 2006 – Wrote the obituary of the unsung Sid Gleason, an early supporter of Bob Dylan and his link to Woody Guthrie.
 2006 – Wrote a two-part series on the history of country music in New Jersey.
 2006 – Profiled the Gallicchio crime family from Newark.
 2006 – Debunked a claim by notorious murderer Richard “The Iceman” Kuklinski that he was one of history's most prolific serial killers.
 2006 – Revisited Judy Garland's appearances in New Jersey with a focus on her 1961 spring concert in Newark held right after her famous Carnegie Hall show.
 2006 – Wrote a two-part series looking back on the life of jazz saxophonist John Coltrane on what would have been his 80th birthday.
 2007 – Wrote a retrospective on burlesque in Newark 50 years after its final performance.
 2007 – Honored guest at the celebration in Newark marking the 50th anniversary of Ghana's independence from the United Kingdom.
 2007 – Broke the story that reputed Genovese crime family capo and accused murderer Michael Coppola was arrested on Manhattan's Upper West Side after 11 years as a fugitive from a Bridgewater, NJ, mob execution.
 2007 – Looked back on Billie Holiday's appearance at a Newark nightclub opposite City Hall on its 50th anniversary.
 2007 – Wrote an obituary for jazz pianist and arranger Bobby Tucker, known best as Billie Holiday and Billy Eckstine's accompanist.
 2007 – Wrote about construction of a casino on the site of an old steel mill in Bethlehem, PA, that was designed to compete with New Jersey for East Coast gambling business.
 2007 – Followed the transatlantic trip of a restored World War II fighter plane 65 years after it had been deemed lost over Greenland.
 2007 – Wrote a retrospective on Ebbets Field and the Polo Grounds on the 50th anniversary of their final Dodger and Giant games. 
 2007 – Wrote the obituary of George Malone, an original member of The Monotones of the “Book of Love” fame.
 2007 – Wrote the obituary of the pastor who got Martin Luther King Jr. to visit his Newark church eight days before his assassination in Memphis.
 2007 – Revisited “Disco-O-Teen,” Newark's version of Dick Clark's TV “Bandstand” show.
 2007 – Covered a court appearance of two men charged with stealing the Goya masterpiece “Children with a Cart."
 2007 – The most prestigious individual award that Sterling won was the national ASCAP/Deems Taylor Award for excellence in music writing, stories he managed to squeeze in around his daily reporting assignments. His love of music led him to organize the Newark Jazz Elders, a group of aging musicians who were recognized in 2007 by New Jersey Gov. Jon Corzine as New Jersey's “living legends jazz band.” Beyond that, he led the drive and contributed half the money to place a bronze plaque on what had been the unmarked grave of Newark keyboard player Larry Young Jr., and he also paid for a headstone to be placed on the grave of North Carolina bluesman and onetime Newark resident "Carolina Slim" (Eddie Paul Harris).
 2008 – Co-authored a story about the unlikely New Jersey couple who ran the exclusive call-girl ring that ensnared then-New York Gov. Eliot Spitzer, causing him to resign from office.
 2008 – Wrote a retrospective on TV's greatest jazz program, “Art Ford's House Party,” on the 50th anniversary of its first airing from Newark.
 2008 – Wrote about the legal fight between two doo-wop groups for the right to perform as “The Duprees."
 2008 – Disproved a developer's claim that an aging building in downtown Newark wasn't the Palace Chop House, where mobster Dutch Schultz was murdered in one of the most notorious gangland slayings in organized crime history.
 2008 – Revisited the life of Lena Donaldson Griffith, Newark's great patron of the arts who brought the world's finest classical musicians to Newark before her death in 1960.
 2008 – Covered the death in prison of Gambino crime family boss Robert “Cabert” Bisaccia whose racketeering trial in Newark in the early 1990s ranks as one of, if not, the longest criminal prosecutions in New Jersey state court history.
 2008 – When he retired from the paper, Sterling was given a plaque for his coverage of organized crime by the U.S. Justice Department and a retirement party by the mob. The Sopranos creator David Chase credited one of his stories with serving as the theme for the series’ 2003 season, shows that were honored the following year with the primetime Emmy Award for Outstanding Drama Series, the first time a cable TV program won the award.
 2009 – Wrote a story about the fate of the Battleship New Jersey Museum & Memorial  as a tourist destination on the Camden waterfront.

Retirement from The Star-Ledger

Following retirement in 2009, Sterling became involved in a number of civic projects in Newark:

 2009-21 – Helped lead the fight against the privatization of Newark's public water system and uncover corruption inside the agency managing the city's watershed property, an effort that resulted in two government investigations and multiple indictments and convictions.
 2009 – Moderated a Newark History Society panel discussion on Kenneth A. Gibson's 16 years as Newark mayor.
 2009 – Delivered one of three keynote addresses at an all-day conference on revitalizing Newark Symphony Hall. Rutgers professor Clement Alexander Price and NJPAC CEO Larry Goldman were the other presenters.
 2009 – Nominated the late jazz singer and Newark native Sarah Vaughan to be honored with a U.S. postage stamp. The stamp was issued in 2016 during a first-day-of-issue ceremony in Newark's Symphony Hall.
 2010 – Delivered a Newark History Society presentation on the history of The-Star-Ledger, with attention given to how the paper could be impacted in the new media age.
 2010 – Spearheaded the drive to erect a bronze statue of Newark native and U.S. Supreme Court Justice William J. Brennan Jr. at the top of the steps of the Hall of Records on King Boulevard in Newark.
 2010 – Delivered a Newark History Society presentation on Newark's worst fatal fire that claimed the lives of 26 lady garment workers.
 2010 – Organized and moderated the centennial commemoration of a fire that claimed the lives of 26 lady garment workers in a Newark sweatshop, the city's worst fatal fire.
 2011 – Profiled in The New York Times about efforts to keep the memory of Newark's worst fatal fire alive – the 1910 High Street factory fire.
 2011 – Mentioned as a trusted organized crime reporter in Wallace Stroby's novel, “Cold Shot to the Heart.”
 2011 – Organized and moderated a program to celebrate the 100th anniversary of Newark's famous Abraham Lincoln statue, Seated Lincoln, by sculptor Gutzon Borglum.
 2012 – Organized and moderated a program in Newark's Washington Park on the 100th anniversary of the dedication of the city's George Washington statue.
 2012 – Assembled and installed a permanent exhibit to the Lincoln statue inside Essex County's historic courthouse, all at personal expense.
 2012 – Led a commemoration on the 150th anniversary of General Philip Kearny's death at the site of his statue in Newark's Military Park.
 2013 – Organized and moderated a ceremony on the steps of Newark City Hall to remember John F. Kennedy and his visits to Newark on the 50th anniversary of the former president's assassination.
 2013 – Delivered the keynote address at the dedication of a historic marker in front of the Mormon church on Orange Street commemorating Newark's worst fatal fire that killed 26 lady garment workers on that site in 1910.
 2014 – Organized and moderated a panel discussion on The Star-Ledger’s departure from Newark, a move that left the city without a daily newspaper for the first time in 175 years.
 2015 – Gave one of two keynote speeches at the Seated Lincoln statue in Newark commemorating the 150th anniversary of the adoption of the 13th Amendment to the U.S. Constitution abolishing slavery.
 2015 – Organized and moderated a program commemorating the 150th anniversary of Abraham Lincoln's death, an event held at Newark's Lincoln statue.
 2015 – Served as one of three panelists in a Newark Museum discussion on the history of jazz in Newark.
 2015 – Participated in the kickoff event for Newark's 350th anniversary celebration in 2016.
 2015 – Delivered a Newark History Society presentation on music in early 20th century Newark, with a special focus on the formative years of noted composer Jerome Kern.
 2016 – Organized and moderated a year-long series of monthly conversations with notable Newarkers at the Newark Public Library as part of the city's celebration of its 350th anniversary. The series was entitled "Newark Lifetimes: Recollections and Reflections" and included a conversation with Newark's mayor Ras Baraka. and former mayors Kenneth Gibson and Sharpe James.
 2016 – Spearheaded a drive to save Newark's nationally landmarked historic Krueger Mansion. Sterling's progress was followed in articles by several German news organizations, including Deutsche Welle.
 2016 – Delivered the keynote address at the Grace Episcopal Church ceremony marking Newark's 350th anniversary.
 2016 – Delivered the keynote presentation at the Newark Public Library's inaugural Newark Literary Festival, an address that focused on authors Claude Brown, Robert Elliott Burns and James Warner Bellah. This presentation was complemented by the republishing of Newark Literary Lights, a book featuring Guy Sterling alongside other notable Newark-born authors.
 2016 – Led the first-ever tour of historic German-American sites in Newark for the Deutscher Club of Clark, NJ.
 2016 – Produced the “Two Centuries of Piano Passion” show featuring Seymour Bernstein at the New Jersey Performing Arts Center in Newark (NJPAC).
 2017 – Delivered a presentation on Newark's Irish at the Newark Public Library as part of the city's St. Patrick's Day celebration.
 2017 – Organized and moderated a Newark Public Library panel discussion on Newark nightlife from the 1950s through 1970s in conjunction with the opening of an exhibit on the collection of publisher Tiny Prince.
 2018 – Delivered a presentation on the life and career of composer Jerome Kern as part of the New Jersey Performing Arts Center annual jazz festival that included a detailed look on the ten years that Kern spent in Newark.
 2019 – Delivered a presentation on the Woodland Cemetery as part of a Newark History Society program on city graveyards at the New Jersey Historical Society.
 2019 – Contributed historical research to the Woodland Cemetery's website.
 2019 – Wrote the tribute in the funeral program for former Newark mayor, Kenneth Gibson.
 2019 – Director of oral history and a co-sponsor of “In Search of a Just City,” an exhibition on the old Essex County Jail (1837-1971) at Newark's Hahne's Building.
 2019 – Revisited a long-forgotten but sensational Newark homicide known as the Reid Ice Cream murder, dating to July 1926.
 2019 – Unearthed the long-forgotten contributions of Italian-American contractor John DiBiase while researching a piece about Newark's Columbus statue and Columbus Day parade.
 2019 – Placed a tombstone in Newark's Woodland Cemetery at the previously unmarked grave of Rico Hightower, a backup vocalist who died in a tragic car accident that also claimed the life of soul singer Billy Stewart and two others in North Carolina on January 17, 1970.
 2020 – Researched and wrote a lengthy piece on Newark's epic contribution to U.S. Olympic history.
 2020 – Remembered a distant uncle whose kindness brought some joy in the depths of the Great Depression.
 2020 – Revisited with new research the life of Frances Day, a Newark chorus girl who became England's biggest stage and screen star in the 1930s.
 2020 – Delivered a presentation on Newark's Lincoln statue as part of a Newark History Society program on the city's public monuments.
 2021 – Researched and recorded a YouTube video on the history of the Irish in Newark to coincide with the celebration St. Patrick's Day.
 2019-22 – Chosen four consecutive years as one of New Jersey's 100 Irish-American leaders by InsiderNJ.
 2021 – Placed a headstone on the previously unmarked grave of Henry Sauerbier, a toolmaker who made swords for the Union Army during the Civil War, at the Woodland Cemetery in Newark.
 2022 – Cited in an InsiderNJ column on Newark's 1910 High Street factory fire.
 2022 – Testified at a New Jersey Historic Sites Council meeting on an application by the City of Newark to remove the Columbus statue in and rename Washington Park.
 2022 – Established the Guy Sterling Collection at the University of Mississippi archives for blues material.
 2022 – Gave a presentation on the Newark Industrial Exhibition of 1872 for the Newark History Society. Event took place at the Newark Public Library, which sponsored it along with the New Jersey Performing Arts Center.

References

Living people
People from Orange, New Jersey
Writers from Newark, New Jersey
American male journalists
Columbia University Graduate School of Journalism alumni
University of Virginia alumni
1948 births